Terisa Greenan (born November 15, 1967) is an American film producer, film director, writer and stage and film actress.

Background
Raised in the suburbs of Los Angeles, Greenan attended Whitney High School (Cerritos, California) from 6th through 12th grade and then went on to graduate from University of California, Davis.  Currently based in Seattle, Greenan operates her film production companies, Petal Films and 3 Dog Pictures.  Greenan has received national and international attention for her semi-autobiographical web series, Family: the web series.  In addition, Greenan has produced several music videos for Seattle band Gaia Consort, and wrote an article on the band for New Witch magazine.  The Newsweek article which profiled Greenan, her web series and her real life family, was named one of Newsweek's Editor's Top Ten articles of 2009.  Greenan's work often portrays a controversial subject in an unexpectedly nonchalant manner.  As an actress, Greenan has worked in films alongside notable actors such as Cary Elwes, Dave Coulier and Tang Wei.  Greenan openly advocates polyamory and lives a polyamorous life with partners Scott and Larry. The group has lived together since 2000.

Filmography

Actress (plus)
 Sleep Come Free Me (1998) as Sally
 The Observation Room (2005)
 The Family Holiday (2008) as Isadora Brown
 Miss Shellagh's Miniskirt (2008) as Margaret Czarnecki (and as director, editor)
 The Day My Parents Became Cool (2009) as Mom
 Family (2008-2009) as Eliza (and as writer, producer, director, editor)
 The Classified (2009) as Kim
 Late Autumn (2010) as Prison guard
 A Face for All Occasions (2010) as Voice 
 Chop Socky Boom  (2 episodes, 2012) as Mitzi
 Someday You (2012) (as producer, director)
 The Rite of Sol, a Rock Opera (2013 (as editor, cinematographer)
 A Bit of Bad Luck (2014) as Country store clerk

Advocacy
Terisa Greenan is an outspoken advocate for sexual freedom and has spoken on the topic of polyamory in various public forums, including multiple appearances on CNN and The BJ Shea Morning Experience, at the Institute for Advanced Study of Human Sexuality and in Canada with John Ince (politician) and Janet Hardy on a panel coinciding with a landmark Canadian court case regarding whether the anti-polygamy section of Canadian Criminal Code 293 was drawn broadly enough to impinge on the human rights of polyamorists.  In 2009, Greenan co-hosted with sex therapist Dr. Roger Libby a weekly radio call-in show "Sex Once A Week" on KKNW.  The radio show offered support and advice to listeners and callers with questions regarding any aspects of sex and sexuality.

"The Year The Press Came Calling, or, How My Girlfriend Mainstreamed Polyamory", ConnotationPress.com.

Awards and nominations
 2013, won shared 'Award of Recognition' from Best Shorts Competition for 'Ensemble Cast' of Chop Socky Boom
 2015, won shared 'Outstanding Achievement Award from LA Web Fest for 'Ensemble Cast: Comedy' Chop Socky Boom

References

External links

Filmmakers from Seattle
Living people
Actresses from Washington (state)
1967 births
American documentary filmmakers
University of California, Davis alumni
American women documentary filmmakers
Polyamorous people
21st-century American women